Kalše is a dispersed settlement in the Pohorje Hills north of Slovenska Bistrica in northeastern Slovenia. The area is part of the traditional region of Styria. It is now included with the rest of the Municipality of Slovenska Bistrica in the Drava Statistical Region.

References

External links
Kalše at Geopedia

Populated places in the Municipality of Slovenska Bistrica